Charles Marcus Edwards is a deacon at a church in Meadville, Mississippi, United States and a self-declared Klansman. In 1964, Edwards, along with James Ford Seale, faced state murder charges for the deaths of two black men, Charles Eddie Moore and Henry Hezekiah Dee, but charges were dropped due to the close cooperation of law enforcement with the Ku Klux Klan. There were rumors circulating amongst members of the KKK that black Muslims were preparing for "insurrection" by bringing guns into Franklin County. Klan members, including Seale, picked up Moore and Dee while they were hitchhiking near Meadville, and beat them with beanpoles until they were unconscious, repeatedly asking the pair to identify who was behind the county's "Negro trouble". Moore and Dee were unconscious but still breathing when the Klansmen dumped their bodies in the Mississippi River. Edwards later confessed to the FBI that he and Seale had kidnapped and beaten two young black men.

In the 2007 documentary Mississippi Cold Case, Thomas Moore, the brother of the murdered Charles Moore, seeks justice for the unpunished killing of Charles and Henry. Thomas confronted Edwards in Meadville, Mississippi, but at first Edwards didn't want to discuss the murder case. All Edwards said was "I ain't guilty of that." Edwards confessed during FBI questioning, but he was given immunity in exchange for this testimony against James Ford Seale. Edwards would testify in the 2007 trial which saw Seale convicted. In his testimony, Edwards stated that he saw the victims stuffed alive into the trunk of Seale's car and then driven away to a farm. He also stated that Seale attached heavy weights to the two boys and then dumped them alive into the river. Edwards himself would be indicted for aiming a shotgun at the victims while Klan members beat them, but was later given immunity in exchange for his testimony.

References

American Ku Klux Klan members
Year of birth missing (living people)
Living people